Kirkbi AG v. Ritvik Holdings Inc., popularly known as the Lego Case, is a decision of the Supreme Court of Canada. The Court upheld the constitutionality of section 7(b) of the Trade-marks Act which prohibits the use of confusing marks, as well, on a second issue it was held that the doctrine of functionality applied to unregistered trade-marks.

Background

History of the Trade-marks Act
While s. 91 of the Constitution Act, 1867 gives the Parliament of Canada jurisdiction over copyright and patent matters, it is silent with respect to trademarks. However, the Judicial Committee of the Privy Council and the Supreme Court of Canada have both suggested in their jurisprudence that the Trade-marks Act is a valid exercise of the federal trade and commerce power.

Lego and Mega Bloks
Kirkbi AG, a member of The Lego Group, previously held patents in the design and form of Lego blocks, which had expired in Canada and elsewhere. Ritvik produced the pieces known as Mega Bloks. Kirkbi attempted to register the design of their blocks as a trade-mark but was denied by the Registrar of Trade-marks.  Kirkbi then asserted unregistered trade-mark rights against Ritvik through an unregistered trade-mark in the distinctive orthogonal pattern of raised studs distributed on the top of each toy-building brick, and claimed relief under s. 7(b) of the Act, as well as under the common law doctrine of passing off.

Ritvik denied any breach under the Act or at common law and counterclaimed, seeking a declaration that it was entitled to continue to make, offer for sale and sell in Canada its blocks and related parts.

Lower courts

Federal Court

Gibson J. dismissed Kirkbi's claim of based on trade-mark, finding that:

 Kirkbi had an interest in an unregistered trademark, but only with respect of the inscription "LEGO" on the top surface of each stud,
 there was no trademark protection in purely functional features, and
 in considering the claim of passing off, while Kirkbi had acquired goodwill in the particular configuration of its bricks, it had failed to prove that Ritvik had intentionally misrepresented its product.

Federal Court of Appeal

Kirkbi's appeal was dismissed. Writing for the majority, Sexton JA did not comment on the questions of confusion and the elements of the tort of passing off, but did find that the doctrine of functionality applied to trade-marks, whether registered or not.

In dissent, Pelletier JA, held:

 the "LEGO" mark, although functional, could still be the basis of a passing-off claim under s. 7(b), as Kirkbi was entitled to protection against the confusing use of its unregistered mark
 the doctrine of functionality was no longer part of the law of trade-marks in Canada in respect of unregistered marks, by reason of changes to the Act
 the elements of passing off had been made out, since, even though no deliberate strategy to deceive had been established, confusion in the market between Kirkbi and Ritvik products had been proved.

Supreme Court

In a unanimous judgment, the appeal was dismissed. In his reasons, LeBel J held that:

 s. 7(b) of the Trade‑marks Act was intra vires the Parliament of Canada, and
 Kirkbi’s passing‑off claim under s. 7(b) must be dismissed, as it is barred by the application of the doctrine of functionality.

Constitutionality

It was not until the case was at the Supreme Court that Ritvik challenged the constitutionality of s. 7(b) of the Trade-marks Act.  LeBel J stated that it was constitutional, saying:

 the intrusion of s. 7(b) into provincial jurisdiction is minimal, as it is remedial and is limited in its application by the provisions of the Act.
 the Trade‑marks Act is a valid exercise of Parliament’s general trade and commerce power.
 s. 7(b) is sufficiently integrated into the Trade‑marks Act, as a "functional relationship", such as is present here, is sufficient to sustain the constitutionality of the provision.

Doctrine of Functionality

Citing jurisprudence dating back to 1964, LeBel noted:

The Court noted that the Trade-marks Act specifically excluded protection from "utilitarian features of a distinguishing guise".  It recognized that allowing the claim created a concern with "overextending monopoly rights on the
products themselves and impeding competition, in respect of wares sharing the same technical characteristics."  The Court agreed with the Federal Court of Appeal ruling, which found no difference between the legal attributes held by registered and unregistered marks.  It looked to the text and the legislative history of the act to determine that there was no intention to give unregistered marks more protection than registered marks.

Passing Off

Though the Court disposed of the case in ruling there was no cause of action under trade-mark law, it nonetheless considered the common law tort of passing off.  It found that three elements were required to establish the tort:

 existence of goodwill,
 deception of the public due to a misrepresentation, and
 actual or potential damage to the plaintiff.

In this case, K's claim was bound to fail because it would not have met the first condition of the action.  The alleged distinctiveness of the product consisted precisely of the process and techniques which were now common to the trade.

While deception had been proven, the SCC noted that the trial judge had interpreted it too narrowly. Misrepresentation may be wilful and may thus mean the same thing as deceit. But now the doctrine of passing off also covers negligent or careless misrepresentation by the trader. As there was no discussion in the present case as to the question of damages, no comment was made.

Impact
Kirkbi, together with General Motors of Canada Ltd. v. City National Leasing, are leading cases on the scope of Parliament's trade and commerce power, particularly with respect to the general branch of that power. It reflects the current view of the Court that favours interprovincial economic integration, especially with the respect to the views expressed by Peter Hogg and Warren Grover:

On the more specific questions of intellectual property law, Kirkbi can also be seen as encouraging manufacturers of products embodying functional modular designs to employ appropriately clever branding and marketing, so that such designs may be seen as a source of distinctiveness, and thus deserving of trademark protection.

See also
 TrafFix Devices, Inc. v. Marketing Displays, Inc., a similar U.S. case.

References

Further reading

 
 
 
 
 

Supreme Court of Canada cases
Trademark case law
Lego
2005 in Canadian case law
Canadian federalism case law